The Krvavec Ski Resort is the second-largest Slovenian ski resort, located in the Municipality of Cerklje na Gorenjskem in the Kamnik–Savinja Alps. The nearest city is Kranj and it is 25 km from Ljubljana. The resort is located 10 km from Ljubljana Jože Pučnik Airport and it is the nearest ski resort to an international airport in Europe. It has a total 30 km of ski slopes.

History
The first lift was opened on August 2, 1958. The lift was made in the factory Žičnica Ljubljana and it was in service for 15 years. In 1966 they built two new lifts, singlechair Gospinica and doublechair which connected Tiha dolina and Njivice. In 1968 they got the first Snow groomer, which increased the quality of ski slopes. In 1973 a consortium was established for Krvavec's development. The result was the new Poma gondola known as eggs. In 1973 they also built two new doublechairs Vrh Krvavca and Njivice and two surface lifts Podradišče and Luža. In 1978 the ski resort was expanded to the Križ Pasture. They built a surface lift system Križišče and a new doublechair Kriška planina. Today's ski resort's top elevation (1971 m) was reached in 1983 when the new doublechair Zvoh was built. In 1989 the Njivice doublechair was replaced with two doublechair lifts Njivice I and Njivice II. In 1999 a new gondola lift (Garaventa) replaced the old one and it provided a better connection between the mountain and the valley. In 2006 a new Doppelmayr sixchair replaced an old doublechair Vrh Krvavca and in 2008 a new Doppelmayr's fourchair replaced an old doublechair Tiha Dolina.In 2010 Zvoh doublechair got new Doppelmayr's seats. In 2012 summer season they opened Summer Park Krvavec and in 2013 they opened a new Doppelmayr surface lift Luža with a double capacity as the 40 years old forerunner.

Accommodation
Because of the great Krvavec's location, many people are accommodated in bigger towns. There is a ski bus from Ljubljana (through Domžale) to Krvavec during the ski season, which operates during the weekends.

Accommodation capabilities on the mountain are:
Hotel Krvavec & Plaža Krvavec*

Snow Park
Krvavec Snow Park is located at the lower part of the Slope 15. Its vertical is 140 m and length is 800 m. It has 6 jumps and 8 different objects (straight box 6m, kink box 6m, straight/down rails 6m: single, double, triple barrel, T rail, barrel).

Ski lifts

Summer activities
Hiking
Mountain biking
Climbing adventure park
Climbing wall
Mountain scooters
Mountain go-carts
Archery range
Slack line range
Trampolines
Frisbee golf
Tube sliding

Further plans

In the early 1990s, plans for Krvavec Ski Resort were extensive, such as expanding the resort to Korenski Vrh and even to the Kalški greben peak, which is over 2000 meters high. These plans covered even the expansion to the eastern side of the Križ Pasture with the new connection with the lift Jezerca. The construction of the new detachable fourchair Jezerca has been proposed since the 1990s, but it hasn't been realized until now, nevertheless it is expected that its construction will be begin in the next years. The Slovenian Government has already issued the concession for the construction and the project is now at the stage of getting the constructional permission.

Gallery

External links

 rtc-krvavec.si - official site
mountainvacation.com - list of accommodations
topskiresort.com - Krvavec resort guide, rating, webcams, news...

Ski areas and resorts in Slovenia
Transmitter sites in Slovenia